Senator Hay may refer to:

Daniel Hay (1781–1853), Illinois State Senate
James Hay (politician) (1856–1931), Virginia State Senate
Logan Hay (1871–1942), Illinois State Senate

See also
Senator Hayes (disambiguation)
Senator Hays (disambiguation)